All Over the Place is a children's television program produced by the BBC. It is similar in ways to the discontinued program Wonderful World of Weird, however All Over the Place is not principally a game show. It features the former CBBC links presenter Ed Petrie as lead presenter, joined across the series by various other CBBC hosts including Chris Johnson, Ceallach Spellman, Richard Wisker, Barney Harwood, Naomi Wilkinson, Sam and Mark, Michelle Ackerley, Lauren Layfield, Johny Pitts and Iain Stirling.

The first two series featured attractions and events primarily in the United Kingdom. The third took the same format but travelled around the USA; the fourth series was based in Australia and the fifth and sixth visited countries around Europe. The 7th and 8th series are about Asia. All Over the Place Asia Part 1 was broadcast on CBBC on Monday 16 January 2017. This new series included a new presenter Inel Tomlinson. The eighth series, All Over The Place Asia part 2, was broadcast on Saturday 6 January 2018, and every Saturday for 15 weeks.

Format
The show features the presenters traveling all over the place in the UK and finding strange and random places to visit. Almost every episode includes a song and a competition segment at the end of the show.

Places visited include:

 Air guitar world championships
 Bat hospital on the Isle of Wight
 The world's largest vacuum cleaner collection, whose owner could tell any vacuum cleaner from its sound alone 
 Preston Bus Station
 The Alnwick Castle treehouse 
 The Storybook Glen
 The Superlambanana in Liverpool.
 Diggerland in Kent
 A World War II veteran pigeon named Paddy
 Dickens World 
 Shakespeare's home town of Stratford-Upon-Avon

The show also features different segments throughout each series including:

Things that stick out of the (sea, river, ground etc.)
Grown-ups collect stuff too
Why have we stopped here....because it's random
What are you thinking?
Things that you see, when you stop for a...
Things that you munch, when you stop for your lunch
Bet you didn't know this about.....
The Song
The Main Event

Presenters

Main presenter

Co-presenters

Episodes

Series 1 (UK)
 The songs featured in Series 1 include...
 Storybook Glen (parody of Beat Again by JLS)
 Castle Ward 
 The 8 Wonders of the Isle of Wight
 Do the Twisted Spire
 Chinese Arch (parody of Chelsea Dagger by The Fratellis)
 Preston Bus Station (parody of Sound of the Underground by Girls Aloud)
 Marsden Grotto
 Lost Gardens of Heligan
 Burning House (parody of Sex on Fire by Kings of Leon)
 House in the Clouds (parody of Our House by Madness)
 Rollercoaster (parody of Hot N Cold by Katy Perry)
 Longest Train Station Name in the UK

Series 2 (UK)

The songs featured in series 2 include...
 Gold Panning (parody of Gold Digger by Kanye West)
 Paddy the Pigeon (parody of U2)
 Llandudno (parody of Pass Out by Tinie Tempah)
 Shakespeare (parody of Tragedy by Steps)
 Can I Dig It? (parody of Can I Kick It by A Tribe Called Quest)
 Hellfire (parody of Fire by Kasabian)
 Ayot St. Lawrence (parody of Country House by Blur)
 Penguin Face (parody of Poker Face by Lady Gaga)
 Rugby (parody of Highway to Hell by AC/DC)
 Fight For This Earth (parody of Fight For This Love by Cheryl Cole)
 Dickensworld
 Funicular (parody of Umbrella by Rihanna & JAY Z)

Series 3 (USA)
A third series was confirmed at the end of Series 2. It was filmed in 2012 and aired in 2013. Instead of being set in the U.K, the presenters visited the United States.

Ed was joined by Naomi Wilkinson, Jonny Pitts, Cellach Spellman, Iain Stirling, Richard Wisker and Michelle Ackerley.

All Over the Place USA was executive produced by Louise Corbett and produced by Maria Stewart.

 The songs in series 3 included:
 Tombstone Cowboys (parody of "Another One Bites the Dust" by Queen)
 Nyberg (parody of "Empire State of Mind" by Alicia Keys and JAY Z)
 Las Vegas Wedding (parody of "Marry You" by Bruno Mars)
 Mall of America (parody of "Price Tag" by Jessie J)
 Troll Town
 They Built This White House Upside Down (parody of "We Built This City" by Starship)
 Petrified (parody of 90s club music)
 London Bridge Ain’t Falling Down
 Giant Christmas Store (parody of "Merry Xmas Everybody" by Slade)
 Heidelberg Project
 Party Shop (parody of "Party Rock Anthem" by LMFAO)
 Paul Bunyan Land (parody of "What Makes You Beautiful" by One Direction)

Series 4 (Australia)
A fourth series, All Over the Place Australia, was broadcast from 2014. As the title indicates, this series focuses on events and attractions in Australia.

Series 5 (Europe)
A fifth series, All Over the Place Europe, began airing on CBBC in early 2015. The show follows the usual AOTP format, including regular fixtures such as 'Grown Ups Collect Stuff Too', 'Things that Stick Out...', 'The Song' and 'The Main Event', and applies them to attractions found in countries across Europe. Newcomers to the presenter lineup this series include Victoria Cook (of DNN: Definitely Not Newsround).

Series 6 (Europe)
A sixth series, All Over the Place Europe: Part 2, began airing on CBBC from 4–22 January 2016 with newcomers Ben Shires from Officially Amazing and Match of the Day Kickabout, Susan Calman (from Top Class) and Lauren Layfield (from CBBC HQ and The Dengineers).

Series 7 (Asia)
Ed Petrie confirmed on Twitter that All Over the Place Asia began filming in 2016 and would be broadcast in 2017. He later announced that the new series would start on Monday 16 January 2017 at 7.45am, on CBBC with returning presenter Cel Spellman, whose last All Over the Place series was series 4 in Australia, and new presenter Inel Tomlinson, known for being part of the comic duo, Johnny & Inel.

Series 8 (Asia Part 2)
Ed Petrie confirmed on Facebook that All Over the Place Asia Part 2, began filming in 2017 and would be broadcast in 2018. He later announced that the new series would start on Saturday 6 January 2018 at 9.00am, on CBBC. This series was also the first one to not have Ed Petrie appear in every section as some co-presenters doubled up, such as Chris Johnson with Lauren Layfield and Johnny Cochrane with Inel Tomlinson. The new series contained returning presenter Barney Harwood from Blue Peter, whose last All Over the Place series was Series 6 in Europe, and new presenters Ricky Martin from Art Ninja, Tee Cee from WHOOPS I MISSED THE BUS, Bobby Lockwood from Wolfblood, Richard David-Caine from Class Dismissed and Johnny Cochrane from The Johnny and Inel Show. Johnny is also the other half of 'Johnny and Inel' (Inel already appears in the show).

Series 8 Episode 1

Title: Supertrees, Laughter Yoga and Rockets

Start block: Gardeners of the Galaxy (parody of Guardians of the Galaxy)

Why have we stopped here? Because it's random (Laughter Yoga)

Song: Mepantigan Mud Games (parody of Shape of You by Ed Sheeran)

Things that you munch, when you stop for your lunch (Kimchi)

Ed vs Richard: The Main Event (rocket festival, Laos)

Series 8 Episode 2

Title: Komodo Dragons, K-Pop and Songkran

Start block: Komodo Dragons

Things That Stick Out of the...(Ground (Genghis Khan statue))

Song: Seoul fan (parody of Soul Man) fused with K-Pop Star (parody of Gangnam Style by Psy)

Things that you munch...when you stop for your lunch (YouChew (parody of YouTube) and Vietnamese Food)

Inel vs Johnny: The Main Event (Songkran (Thai New Year) water fight)

Series 9 (UK)
A new All Over the Place UK began filming in 2018 and was broadcast in 2019. The new series started on Monday 25 February 2019 at 4:30pm on CBBC. This series was the second not to have Ed Petrie appear in every section as some co-presenters doubled up, such as Richard David-Caine with Inel Tomlinson and Sam Nixon with Mark Rhodes. The new series contained returning presenters Sam & Mark, whose last All Over the Place series was Series 7 in Asia (in past series they only featured in sketches but in Series 9 they presented segments on location), and new presenter Yasmin Evans from Saturday Mash-Up!, as well as a variety of vloggers who introduced and linked segments in the show.

Accolades

Spin-off

In 2016, a spin-off series titled All Over the Workplace premiered. The series is hosted by Alex Riley and is narrated by Ed Petrie. Two series have aired.

References

External links

BBC children's television shows
2010s British children's television series
2011 British television series debuts
CBBC shows
Television series by BBC Studios